Musik, dans & party 2 is a 1986 studio album by Sten & Stanley.

Track listing
Tillsammans
Han sjunger om kärlek
Den vita duvan
Jag vill vakna upp med dig (I Wanna Wake up with You)
Jorden är så skön
I ditt fönster brinner ett ljus (In deinem Zimmer brennt noch Licht)
Har vi träffats förr nå'n gång (Midnight Lady)
En sång om kärlek (Härlighetens morgon)
Skynda dig hem (Dio come vorrei)
Fast för dej (Stuck with You)
Blad faller tyst som tårar (Leaves are the Tears of Autmn)
Ta det lugnt (Walk Right Back)
Det var en underlig historia (Giorni senza gloria)
Living Doll.

Charts

References 

1986 albums
Sten & Stanley albums